Viktor Sergeevich Safronov (born Velikie Luki; 11 October 1917 in Russia – 18 September 1999 in Moscow, Russia) was a Soviet astronomer who put forward the low-mass-nebula model of planet formation, a consistent picture of how the planets formed from a disk of gas and dust around the Sun.

Biography and legacy
Safronov graduated from Moscow State University Department of Mechanics and Mathematics in 1941. He defended a dissertation for the Doctor of Physical and Mathematical Sciences in 1968. His scientific interests covered planetary cosmogony, astrophysics and geophysics.

His planetesimal hypothesis of planet formation is still widely accepted among astronomers, although alternative theories exist (such as the gravitational fragmentation of the protoplanetary disk directly into planets).

A minor planet, 3615 Safronov, discovered by US-American astronomer Edward L. G. Bowell in 1983, is named after him.

The 1999 BBC documentary miniseries The Planets discusses Safronov's work at length.

Awards
Otto Schmidt USSR Academy of Sciences Prize (1974)
Leonard Prize Meteoritical Society (1989)
Kuiper Prize in Planetary Science (1990)

List of selected publications 
Evolution of the Protoplanetary Cloud and Formation of the Earth and the Planets. Moscow: Nauka Press, 1969. Trans. NASA TTF 677, 1972.

See also
Accretion (astrophysics)
George Wetherill

References

External links
List of Gerard Kuiper award recipients at the website of American Astronomical Society
 A short biography

Safronov
Soviet astronomers
1917 births
1999 deaths
Moscow State University alumni